Jennifer Katherine Fox Harris (née Egan; born 7 July 1977) is a former Australian rugby union player. She made her test debut for Australia in 2001 against England in Sydney. She played six test matches for the Wallaroos from 2001 to 2002.

Harris competed for the Wallaroos at the 2002 Rugby World Cup in Spain. She was named on the bench for Australia's squad that faced the Black Ferns in their final pool game.

References 

1977 births
Living people
Australian female rugby union players
Australia women's international rugby union players